Jaison is a masculine given name. Notable people with the name include:

 Jaison Ibarrola (born 1986), Paraguayan footballer
 Jaison McGrath (born 1996}, Scottish footballer
 Jaison Peters (born 1989), West Indian cricketer
 Jaison Robinson (born 1980), contestant from Survivor: Samoa
 Jaison Vales (born 1988), Indian footballer

See also
Jason (given name)

Masculine given names